Siti Nurhaliza is the debut album by  Malaysian singer Siti Nurhaliza released in 1996. This album is the debut of her after winning in a singing competition by RTM, Bintang HMI 1995, where she recorded in 1996. The album is self-titled, and composed almost entirely of pop and ballad genre with its famous debut single Jerat Percintaan which later won the 11th Anugerah Juara Lagu in the same year and sold more than 50,000 copies. She won the title during her first entrance to Anugerah Juara Lagu by beating favourites at that time, Ziana Zain and Fauziah Latiff.

Siti Nurhaliza I is one of Siti's first of six albums with collaboration with Adnan Abu Hassan, who contributes seven songs in the album.

Production
After winning Bintang HMI in 1995 and the successful release of her duet single with 2 by 2, "Mawarku" ("My Rose"), Siti Nurhaliza was approached by renowned music producer Adnan Abu Hassan and offered her a recording contract with Suria Records in which Adnan who was the label's General Manager at that time. Soon after, the label's manager Tan Su Loke came to her hometown in Temerloh to ask Siti's father, Tarudin Ismail to sign a contract. Prior to joining Suria Records, Siti receive a recording deal with major recording companies – Sony Music, BMG Music and Warner Music. Working with Adnan, who taught her a vocal class, she records her debut album. "Jawapan di Persimpangan" ("An Answer at the Interchange") is the first song to be recorded in this album.

During the recording of her album, which took place between mid 1995 and early 1996, Siti had to divide her time between Kuala Lipis and Kuala Lumpur every week on Friday by riding bus accompanied by her mother, Siti Salmah Bachik and Siti's brother, Saiful Bahri and return to her hometown in Kuala Lipis on Sunday afternoon as she is still schooling and sitting Sijil Pelajaran Malaysia (SPM) exams.

Release and reception
Siti Nurhaliza was released on 1 April 1996 by Suria Records, with Adnan Abu Hassan as the album producer and two music videos was released from the album – "Jerat Percintaan" and "Jawapan di Persimpangan". The album was well-received and sold more than 50,000 copies, leading Siti Nurhaliza herself won the Best New Female Artist at the 1997 Anugerah Industri Muzik and two nominations for the Best Pop Album and Best Vocal Performance in an Album (Female) at the same award in 1998.

Three singles was released from this album, Jerat Percintaan ("Love Trap"), Jawapan Di Persimpangan ("Answer at the Corner") and Cari-Cari ("Looking"). The album itself as of 2005, has been sold to a total of more than 800,000 units in Malaysia alone.

Siti Nurhaliza would go on to record five more albums with Adnan: Siti Nurhaliza II (1997), Adiwarna (1998), Pancawarna (1999), Safa (2001) and Lentera Timur (2008).

Track listing

Personnel
Credits adapted from Siti Nurhaliza I booklet liner notes.

 Aidiet – guitar
 Ariffin – promotion unit
 Bard – promotional manager
 Chia – engineer
 Peter Fam – producer
 Jason Foo – production coordinator
 Adnan Abu Hassan – producer, vocals
 Nina Abu Hassan – vocals
 Heintje – make-up
 A.D. Ho – photography
 Sham Amir Hussain – A&R manager
 Idah – vocals
 Genesis Mastering Lab – mixing

 Tan Su Loke – executive producer
 Zulkefli Majid – A&R coordinator
 Fauzi Marzuki – producer
 Hani M.J – songwriter
 Amran Omar – songwriter
 AS Design & Print – creation
 Rahayu – promotion unit
 Riz – promotion unit
 Lukman S – songwriter
 Sabariah – promotion unit (Singapore)
 Shahnaz – songwriter
 Vincent – engineer
 Othman Zainuddin – songwriter

Accolades
 Song Champion, 11th Anugerah Juara Lagu 1996 (Jerat Percintaan)
 Best Performance, 11th Anugerah Juara Lagu 1996 (Jerat Percintaan)
 Best Ballad, 11th Anugerah Juara Lagu 1996 (Jerat Percintaan)
 Best Song, 4th Anugerah Industri Muzik 1997 (Jerat Percintaan)

References

External links
 Siti Nurhaliza – Official Website

1996 debut albums
Siti Nurhaliza albums
Suria Records albums
Malay-language albums